Paravane may refer to:

 Operation Paravane, a World War II operation
 Paravane (water kite), a towed winged underwater object
 Paravane (weapon), a towed underwater device used in minesweeping and anti-submarine warfare